Diospyros sumatrana is a tree in the family Ebenaceae. Inflorescences bear up to three flowers. The tree is named for Sumatra. Habitat is lowland mixed dipterocarp forests. D. sumatrana is found from Indochina to Malesia.

References

sumatrana
Plants described in 1852
Trees of Indo-China
Trees of Malesia
Taxa named by Friedrich Anton Wilhelm Miquel